Costel Ciprian Mozacu (born 30 September 1976 in Plopii-Slăvitești, Romania) is a Romanian football midfielder who played with Aris Limassol in Cyprus.  His former teams are: Steaua Mizil, Tractorul Brașov, Olimpia Satu Mare, Oțelul Galați, Petrolul Ploieşti, Steaua București and FC Naţional București, Concordia Chiajna.

External links
 
 

Living people
1976 births
Footballers from Bucharest
Romanian footballers
Romanian expatriate footballers
Association football midfielders
Liga I players
Cypriot First Division players
FC Olimpia Satu Mare players
ASC Oțelul Galați players
FC Brașov (1936) players
FC Petrolul Ploiești players
FC Steaua București players
FC Progresul București players
CS Concordia Chiajna players
Aris Limassol FC players
Expatriate footballers in Cyprus
Romanian expatriate sportspeople in Cyprus